Raising Genius (working title Bathroom Boy) is a 2004 American comedy film written by Linda Voorhees and co-directed by her with Bess Wiley.  The film stars Justin Long, Wendie Malick, Ed Begley, Jr., Stephen Root, Danica McKellar, Mark DeCarlo, Tippi Hedren, Shirley Jones, Clint Howard, and Sam Huntington. It was a selection of the Paris Film Festival in Paris, France, in 2005, and also played at the Waterfront Film Festival in South Haven, Michigan in 2005.

Plot
Nancy Nestor (Wendie Malick) is the perfect wife and mother now at her wits' end when her teenage genius son Hal (Justin Long) locks himself in the bathroom for months to work on a mathematical equation which involves studying of Lacy Baldwin (Danica McKellar), a cheerleader next door, as she bounces up and down on a trampoline. Nancy's husband Dwight (Stephen Root) is too wrapped up in his own petty concerns to help her.  When a burglary brings the police to inspect the crime scene, they find Hal locked in the bathroom and suspect he is being held against his will and call Social Services.

Cast

 Justin Long as Hal Nestor
 Wendie Malick as Nancy Nestor
 Ed Begley Jr. as Dr. Curly Weeks
 Stephen Root as Dwight Nestor
 Danica McKellar as Lacy Baldwin
 Megan Cavanagh as Charlene Hobbs
 Mark DeCarlo as Officer Hunter
 Tippi Hedren as Babe
 Clint Howard as Mr. Goss
 Sam Huntington as Bic
 Shirley Jones as Aunt Sis
 Joel David Moore as Rolf
 Travis Wester as Rudy
 J. Bretton Truett as Dr. Van Heizen

References

External links
 
 

2004 films
2004 comedy films
Films about mathematics
Films about obsessive–compulsive disorder
2000s English-language films